Marianne Giguère is a politician in Montreal, Quebec, Canada. She has served on the Plateau-Mont-Royal borough council since 2013 and on the Montreal city council since 2017 as a member of Projet Montréal. In November 2017, she was appointed as an associate member of new mayor Valérie Plante's Montreal executive committee (i.e., the municipal cabinet).

Private career
Giguère was an educational consultant before entering political life. She is also a singer and percussionist. Her campaign literature indicates that she joined Projet Montréal at the time of the party's founding in 2004.

Borough councillor
Giguère was elected to the Plateau-Mont-Royal borough council in the 2013 Montreal municipal election, defeating incumbent councillor Carl Boileau in the De Lorimier ward. Projet Montréal emerged as the official opposition on city council after the election and won every seat in Plateau-Mont-Royal to continue as the local governing authority in the borough. In January 2014, Giguère was appointed as her party's critic on urban agriculture, cycling, and green spaces.

On the day following her appointment, she urged the city to develop a plan to confront the presence of the emerald ash borer beetle in the city's parks and woodlands. She also called for the city to improve access to public beaches, and she supported the Plateau-Mont-Royal council's decision to limit one-hour free parking spots for shoppers in a bid to decrease car traffic in the area.

Cycling issues
Giguère's primary area of focus during her first term was cycling and cyclist safety. She approved of the Montreal executive committee's decision to purchase the local assets of the bicycle sharing system Bixi in February 2014 after the company filed for bankruptcy, though she argued that the service should be taken over by the Société de transport de Montréal in the longer term. She also called on the government of Quebec to modernize its highway safety code in April of the same year, saying that the existing code did not reflect the increased presence of urban cycling. In September 2014, she urged the city to prioritize bike lanes on busy, arterial streets rather than in comparatively safe residential areas.

In early 2015, the city opened a new bike lane on Saint Laurent Boulevard that met with a negative response from cyclists due to the absence of lane markings, a trajectory that some described as dangerous, and the fact that it ended with no obvious path for cyclists on which cyclists could continue. Giguère joined in the criticism, remarking, "It takes people who don't understand bicycles to design something like that. It makes no sense." She did, however, support the city government's decision to dedicate a bike path on Saint Denis Street later in the year, and she supported the city's twelve-point set of recommendations to reform the provincial highway safety code for the benefit of cyclists.

Giguère argued in 2016 that the interests of cyclists were often ignored in Montreal's urban renovation projects. "We're really stagnating in terms of new dedicated paths that will bring out new cyclists," she said Marianne Giguère. "We have the idea that they're adding a few kilometres year after year, but there's no great vision." In the same year, she presented a workshop on Projet Montréal's efforts to improve cyclist and pedestrian safety at the Pro Walk/Pro Bike/Pro Place conference in Vancouver.

City councillor
Giguère was elected for the De Lorimier city ward in the 2017 Montreal municipal election, in which Projet Montréal won the mayoralty, a majority of seats of the Montreal city council, and, once again, every seat on the Plateau-Mont-Royal borough council. Following the election, she was appointed as an associate member of the Montreal executive committee with responsibility for sustainable development and active transit. She works with executive councillors Luc Ferrandez and Jean-François Parenteau on the first of these files and with executive councillor Éric Alan Caldwell on the second.

By virtue of holding her seat on city council, Giguère continues to serve on the Plateau-Mont-Royal borough council.

Electoral record

References

Living people
Montreal city councillors
People from Le Plateau-Mont-Royal
Women municipal councillors in Canada
Year of birth missing (living people)